The ANZ Premiership is the top level netball league featuring teams from New Zealand. In 2017 it replaced the ANZ Championship, which also included teams from Australia, as the top level netball league in New Zealand. It is organised by Netball New Zealand. Its main sponsor is ANZ. In 2017, Southern Steel were the inaugural ANZ Premiership winners. Central Pulse are the league's most successful team, having won three premierships.

History

Formation
In May 2016, Netball Australia and Netball New Zealand announced that the ANZ Championship would be discontinued after the 2016 season. In New Zealand it was replaced by the ANZ Premiership, while in Australia it was replaced by Suncorp Super Netball The founding members of ANZ Premiership included the five former New Zealand ANZ Championship teams – Central Pulse, Mainland Tactix, Northern Mystics, Southern Steel and Waikato Bay of Plenty Magic  – plus a brand new franchise, Northern Stars.

Inaugural champions
With a team coached by Reinga Bloxham, captained by Wendy Frew and featuring Gina Crampton, Jhaniele Fowler-Reid, Shannon Francois, and Jane Watson, Southern Steel finished the 2017 season as inaugural ANZ Premiership winners. After finishing the regular season unbeaten and as minor premiers, Steel defeated Central Pulse 69–53 in the grand final. This saw Steel complete a 16 match unbeaten season. Steel subsequently went onto to retain their title and in the 2018 grand final they again defeated Pulse.

Central Pulse
During the early ANZ Premiership era, Central Pulse emerged as one of the leagues strongest teams. Between 2017 and 2020, with a team coached by Yvette McCausland-Durie, captained by Katrina Grant and featuring, among others, Karin Burger, Ameliaranne Ekenasio and Claire Kersten, Pulse played in four successive grand finals. Between 2018 and 2020 they won three successive minor premierships. Pulse were the 2019 and 2020 overall champions.
In 2022, Pulse won their third title.

Teams

Grand finals

Minor premierships

Premiership winning coaches

Premiership winning captains

Top goal scorers

Award winners

New Zealand Netball Awards

ANZ Premiership Player of the Year

ANZ Premiership Coach of the Year

Television coverage
Matches are broadcast live on Sky Sport (New Zealand).

References

External links
  ANZ Premiership on Facebook
  ANZ Premiership on Twitter
  ANZ Premiership on Instagram

ANZ Premiership
Netball leagues in New Zealand
Professional sports leagues in New Zealand
Sports leagues established in 2016
2016 establishments in New Zealand